Oleg Slaviyevich Morozov (born 3 January 1966) is a Russian professional football coach and a former player. He is the manager of FC Kvant Obninsk.

Club career
He made his professional debut in the Soviet Second League in 1985 for Dynamo Kashira. He played 4 games in the UEFA Cup 1994–95 with FC Tekstilshchik Kamyshin.

Throughout his career he always played on the same team as his identical twin brother Aleksey Morozov.

References 

1966 births
People from Obninsk
Living people
Soviet footballers
Russian footballers
Association football midfielders
Russian Premier League players
FC Fakel Voronezh players
FC Tekstilshchik Kamyshin players
FC Saturn Ramenskoye players
FC Lokomotiv Nizhny Novgorod players
Russian twins
Twin sportspeople
FC Dynamo Moscow reserves players
Russian football managers
Sportspeople from Kaluga Oblast